Moldovenism is a political term used to refer to the support and promotion of the Moldovan identity and Moldovan culture primarily by the opponents of such ideas.

Some of its supporters ascribe this identity to the medieval Principality of Moldavia. Others, in order to explain the current differences between Romanian-speaking inhabitants of the two banks of the Prut River, ascribe it to the long incorporation of Bessarabia in the Russian Empire and the Soviet Union. The opponents, on the contrary, claim that Moldovans and Romanians are a single ethnic group and that the Moldovan identity was artificially created by the USSR.

Supporters of Moldovan identity contend that the people of Moldavia historically self-identified as "Moldavian" before the notion of "Romanian" became widespread. The belief that Romanians and Moldovans in Bessarabia and the Moldavian ASSR (MASSR) formed two separate ethnonational groups, speaking different languages and possessing separate historical and cultural traits was also endorsed by the Soviet Union.

Historical development

Creation of Moldavian ASSR
In 1812 the Russian Empire and the Ottoman Empire signed the Treaty of Bucharest (1812), by which Russia annexed the eastern part of the medieval Principality of Moldavia. This territory became known as Bessarabia. Between 1859 and 1866, Principality of Moldavia and the neighbouring Principality of Wallachia united into a single country called Romania. In 1917, when the Russian Empire was disintegrating, a Moldavian Democratic Republic was formed in Bessarabia. In 1918, after the Romanian army gained control of the region, Sfatul Țării proclaimed the independence of the Moldavian Republic and, later, voted for the union with Romania. Soviet Russia contested the outcome of these events and, in May 1919, proclaimed the Bessarabian Soviet Socialist Republic as a government in exile. After the Soviet-organized Tatarbunary Uprising failed, in 1924 a Moldavian ASSR (MASSR) was created within the Ukrainian SSR, just east of the river Dniester that then marked the boundary between the Kingdom of Romania and the Soviet Union.

For the purpose of giving MASSR its own identity separate from Romania, Soviet authorities declared the variety spoken by the majority of Moldavians to be "Moldavian language". The intellectual elites of the MASSR were asked to standardise a Moldovan literary language based on the local dialects of MASSR, which are similar to Romanian.

Until the 1920s the Russians did not argue that Moldovans and their neighbors in the Romanian Principalities somehow formed nations. One observer wrote in 1846 in the journal of the Russian foreign ministry that “the inhabitants of upper Bessarabia are essentially Romanians, that is, a mixture of Slavs and Romans, and sons of the Greek Orthodox Church". In May 1917, at a congress of Bessarabian teachers, a group protested against being called "Romanians", affirming they were "Moldovans".

Representatives of the Romanian-speaking population living in Podolia, and Kherson participated in the Bessarabian national movement in 1917 and early 1918, agitating for incorporation of the territory across Dniester into the Greater Romanian Kingdom. The Romanian government never took significant interest in these demands, which would have implied large-scale military operations, and settled in the end to leave behind those areas, which became part of Soviet Ukraine after the Russian Civil War. The calls from Transnistrian émigrés continued into the 1920s asking for Romania to fund schools in the region as there were schools and cultural organizations in regions inhabited by speakers of cognate Latin languages in the Balkans. Refugees flooded across the Dniester and special funds were put aside for housing and education.

Nichita Smochină, an educator settled in Paris, founded the Associations of Transnistrian Romanians in order to assist 20,000 refugees from across the Dniester, and welcomed the creation of the Moldavian Autonomous Soviet Republic.

Pavel Chior, the MASSR People's Commissar of Education, argued that literary Romanian borrowed too many French language words during its standardization in the 19th century. According to Chior, this made it incomprehensible to the peasants both in the MASSR and Romania, demonstrating the division between the "ruling class" and the "exploited class". Soviet linguist M. V. Sergievsky studied linguistic variation in the MASSR and identified two dialects. One, similar to the spoken variety in Bessarabia, was chosen as the standard, to pave the way for the "liberation of the Bessarabians". Gabriel Buciușcanu, a Socialist Revolutionary member of Sfatul Țării who opposed the union with Romania, wrote a new grammar compendium in 1925, but it was considered too similar to standard Romanian grammar, and was quickly pulled out of circulation.

Romanizators and autochthonists

In the 1920s, there was a dispute among the Soviet linguists between supporters ("Romanizators" or "Romanists") and opponents ("autochthonists", Russian: самобытники) of the convergence of the Moldavian and Romanian.

The "autochthonists" strove to base the literary Moldovan on local dialects from the left bank of the Dniester. Neologisms, mostly from Russian, were created to cover technical areas that had no native equivalent.

Then in February 1932, communists in the MASSR received a directive from the Communist Party of Ukraine to switch Moldovan writing to the Latin alphabet. This was part of the massive Latinization campaign of minority languages in the USSR, based on the theory of Soviet linguist Nikolai Marr postulating the convergence to a single world language, expected to be a means of communication in the future classless society (Communism). This directive was passively sabotaged by the "autochthonist" majority, until Stanislav Kosior (General Secretary of the Ukrainian Communist Party) and several MASSR communists visited Joseph Stalin — who reportedly insisted on faster Latinization with the ultimate goal of the convergence of Moldavian and Romanian cultures, hinting at the possibility of a future reunion of Moldova and Romania within the Soviet state. Nevertheless, resistance to Romanization among communist activists persisted, and after 1933, a number of prominent "autochthonists" were repressed, their books destroyed, and their neologisms banned.

After the infamous February–March (1937) Central Committee of the Communist Party of the Soviet Union plenum, which escalated the Great Purge, both "Romanizators" and "autochthonists" were declared "imperialist spies": "autochthonists", because they sabotaged the Latinization, and "Romanizators", because they were "agents of boyar Romania" ("Боярская Румыния"), i.e., anti-Soviet.

In February 1938, Moldovan communists issued a declaration transferring Moldovan writing to the Cyrillic alphabet once again, which in August 1939 was made into a law of the Moldavian ASSR, and after 1940, of the Moldavian SSR. The motivation given was that the Latinization was used by "bourgeois-nationalist elements" to "distance the Moldavian populace from the Ukrainian and Russian ones, with the ultimate goal of the separation of Soviet Moldavia from the USSR".

Moldovans in Soviet Moldova
In June 1940 Bessarabia was occupied by the Soviet Union. Most of Bessarabia and about half of the MASSR were merged into a newly created Moldavian SSR, which became the fifteenth union republic of the USSR. A year later, in June 1941, Romania attacked the Soviet Union as part of Operation Barbarossa and retook Bessarabia (see Operation München). Between 1941 and 1944, Romania also occupied the territory between the Dniester and Bug rivers (historic Transnistria). By August 1944 the Soviets had taken back all the territories they lost in 1941, which remained in the Soviet Union until the latter's dissolution in 1991.

During the first years of Soviet occupation, the term "Romanian language" was forbidden. The official language for use in Moldovan schools throughout the entire MSSR (both in Bessarabia and Transnistria) during Stalinist period was based on a local variety spoken in some areas of the former MASSR. The Commission for the Study of the Communist Dictatorship in Moldova is assessing this period.

In 1956, during the Nikita Khrushchev's rehabilitation of the victims of Stalinist repressions, a special report was issued about the state of the Moldavian language. The report stated, in part, that the discussions of 1920-30s between the two tendencies had been mostly non-scientific, since there were very few linguists in the republic; and that the grammar and the basic lexicon of the literary Romanian and Moldovan languages are identical, while differences are secondary and nonessential. Because the political situation in the People's Republic of Romania was now pro-Soviet, the planned convergence of the Romanian and Moldovan languages was once again approved.

During the entire period of Soviet rule, Moldovan speakers were encouraged to learn the Russian language as a prerequisite for access to higher education, social status and political power. Transfers of territory and population movements, including deportations of locals and state-encouraged immigration from the rest of the USSR, shifted the ethnic and linguistic makeup of the republic. By the late 1970s, the number of Russian speakers in the Moldavian SSR had greatly increased. These changes contributed to the proliferation of Russian loanwords in the spoken Moldovan.

While some Soviet linguists continued to deny the existence of a distinct Moldovan language, a new generation of Soviet linguists revived the debate in the 1970s. For example, one linguist, Iliașenco, compared the Romanian and Moldovan translations of a Leonid Brezhnev speech from Russian and used them as a proof for the existence of two different languages. Mikhail Bruchis analysed this claim, and noticed that all the words of both translations are found in both dictionaries. Also, Iliașenco implied that "Moldovan" preferred synthetic syntagms, while "Romanian" preferred analytic ones. However, this claim was also proven wrong, as a book of Nicolae Ceaușescu (the political leader of Romania at the time) uses mostly "Moldovan" synthetic syntagms, while a book by Ivan Bodiul (the secretary of the Moldavian SSR) uses mostly "Romanian" analytic syntagms. Bruchis' conclusion was that both translations were within the limits of the Romanian language.

Debates in independent Moldova
The debate surrounding the ethnicity of Moldovans has resurfaced after the collapse of the USSR. One side, rallying many prominent Moldovan intellectuals, such as Grigore Vieru, Eugen Doga or Constantin Tănase, argues that Moldovans have always been Romanians, even if the modern history separated them from the rest of Romanians. Moldovenism is thus regarded as a Soviet attempt to create an artificial nationality with the goal of ethnic assimilation of Romanians living in the Soviet Union. The other side emphasizes the distinctiveness of Moldovans such as Moldovan historian and politician Victor Stepaniuc states that Moldovans have always been different from Romanians. Some claim that, for Bessarabian Moldovans, the long isolation from the rest of Romanians (between 1812–1918, after 1940) was "more than ample time [...] to develop [their] own separate national identity".

After collaborating for several years with the Pan-Romanian Popular Front of Moldova, acting president Mircea Snegur moved close to the Agrarian Party of Moldova, a strong supporter of the Moldovan identity. During his visit to Bucharest in February 1991, he talked about "Romanians on both banks of the Prut River", however, during the presidential campaign in 1994, Snegur stressed in the speech Our Home the existence of a distinct Moldovan nation as the foundation of the state. The speech was immediately condemned by the intellectuals. Representatives of The Writers' Union, the Institute of Linguistics, the Institute of History, Chișinău State University, and other institutions declared the speech an affront to the true identity of the republic's ethnic majority and an attempt to further “an invention of the Communist regime” by erecting a “barrier to authentic Romanian culture”. Nevertheless, Snegur's stance helped the Agrarian Party of Moldova win an absolute majority in the Parliament.

Moldovan self-consciousness
A poll conducted in the Republic of Moldova by IMAS-Inc Chișinău in October 2009 presented a detailed picture. The respondents were asked to rate the relationship between the identity of Moldovans and that of Romanians on a scale between 1 (entirely the same) to 5 (completely different). The poll showed that 26% of the entire sample, which included all ethnic groups, claimed the two identities were the same or very similar, whereas 47% claimed they were different or entirely different. The results varied significantly among different categories of subjects. For instance, while 33% of the young respondents (ages 18–29) chose the same or very similar and 44% different or very different, among the senior respondents (aged over 60) the corresponding figures were 18.5% and 53%. The proportion of those who chose the same or very similar identity was higher than the average among the native speakers of Romanian/Moldovan (30%), among the urban dwellers (30%), among those with higher education (36%), and among the residents of the capital city (42%).

According to a study conducted in the Republic of Moldova in May 1998, when the self-declared Moldovans were asked to relate the Romanian and Moldovan identities, 55% considered them somewhat different, 26% very different and less than 5% identical.

A survey carried out in the Republic of Moldova by William Crowther in 1992 showed that 87% of the Romanian/Moldovan speakers chose to identify themselves as "Moldovans", rather than "Romanians".

The 2004 census results reported that out of the 3,383,332 people living in Moldova (without Transnistria), 75.81% declared themselves Moldovans and only 2.17% Romanians. A group of international observers considered the census was generally conducted in a professional manner, although they reported several cases when enumerators encouraged respondents to declare themselves Moldovans rather than Romanians.

The 2014 census results reported that out of the 2,998,235 people living in Moldova (without Transnistria), 75.1% declared themselves Moldovans and 7.0% Romanians. The information about the language they usually speak indicate that 54.6% consider the language to be Moldovan and 24.0% consider it to be Romanian.

Political implications
On 19 December 2003, the Moldovan Parliament, dominated by the Party of Communists of the Republic of Moldova, adopted a non-judicial political document called "The Concept of National Policy of the Republic of Moldova". The document claims that:
 there are two different peoples (Romanians and Moldovans) that share a common literary language. "Sharing their source, having a common basic lexical foundation, the national Moldovan language and the national Romanian language each preserve their language name as an identifier of every nation: Moldovan and Romanian."
 Romanians are an ethnic minority in Moldova.
 the Republic of Moldova is the rightful successor of the medieval Principality of Moldova.

This document faced criticism in Moldova as being "anti-European" and contradicting the Constitution which states that "no ideology may be adopted as official state ideology".

Moldovan historian Gheorghe E. Cojocaru, in his book Cominternul si originile Moldovenismului, claims that "Moldovenism" and its dissemination among the Romance speakers living east of the Prut are of Soviet origin. On the occasion, Moldovan politician and historian Alexandru Moșanu claimed that "The Moldovenist ideology appeared as a policy of ethnic assimilation of the Romanians from Transnistria, then from the entire space of the former Moldavian Soviet Socialist Republic. And now from the Republic of Moldova." On 22 January 2010, the Romanian Ministry of Foreign Affairs launched the book in Bucharest. At the release of the book, the Foreign Minister of Romania Teodor Baconschi said: 

Marian Lupu, leader of the Democratic Party of Moldova and a well-known Moldovenist, rebuked him, declaring:

See also
 Greater Moldova
 Moldovan–Romanian dictionary
 Moldovan language
 Unification of Romania and Moldova

References

 Argentina Gribincea, Mihai Grecu Moldova: Situation analysis and trend assessment  commissioned by the United Nations High Commissioner for Refugees, October 2004
 Grenoble, Lenore A (2003) Language Policy in the Soviet Union, Springer, 
 M. Bărbulescu, D. Deletant, K. Hitchins, S. Papacostea, P. Teodor - Istoria României. Ed. Corint, 2004,

Further reading
 Argentina Gribincea Moldovenism: the State Ideology of the Republic of Moldova
 Monica Heintz Republic of Moldova versus Romania: The Cold Var of National Identities
 Argentina Gribincea Moldovenisti pentru linistea expansionismului rusesc sau cautatori de sine 
 Evocare Eugeniu Coşeriu (22)  Contrafort, October-November 2003
 Constitutional Watch A country-by-country update on constitutional politics in Eastern Europe and the ex-USSR, Summer 2002
 Constitutional Watch A country-by-country update on constitutional politics in Eastern Europe and the ex-USSR, Winter 2002/Spring 2003
 "Moldovan-Romanian Dictionary" by Former Communist Deputy Available for Sale July 29 2003 
 Marian Enache, Dorin Cimpoiesu Misiune diplomatica in Moldova 1993-1997, Bucharest, Polirom, 2000  
 Eugen Holban - Dreptul la adevar  Observatorul, Wednesday, Dec 20, 2006
 Mai multe literaturi, o limbă, mai multe limbi, o literatură. A treia Conferinţă internaţională a Centrului PEN Român, Iaşi, 21-23 aprilie 2000 
 Matthew H. Ciscel (2007) The Language of the Moldovans: Romania, Russia, and Identity in an Ex-Soviet Republic",  - About the identity of the contemporary Moldovans in the context of debates about their language.
 Translation of Russian loans and irregularities of the spoken language in the Republic of Moldova by Eleonora Rusnac, President, Association of Professional Translators of Moldova.
 George Damian - Efectele moldovenismului si strategia regionala a Ucrainei  Ziua Veche, Friday, Mar 26, 2010 
 About Moldovan/Romanian language and identity see also, in French, Nikolas Trifon, "Guerre et paix des langues sur fond de malaise identitaire" in la République de Moldavie : un Etat en quête de nation, Paris : Non Lieu, 2010, pp. 169–276.

Anti-Romanian sentiment
Articles containing video clips
Controversy over ethnic and linguistic identity in Moldova
Moldova–Romania relations
Nationalism in Moldova
Nationalism in the Soviet Union
Romania–Soviet Union relations